Qazi Khan, Ilam may refer to:
Qazi Khan-e Olya
Qazi Khan-e Sofla